Vineet, alternatively Vineeth, is an Indian name. Notable people with the name include:

Vineet
Vineet Alurkar, Indian musician
Vineet M. Arora, American medical researcher
Vineet Jain, Indian businessman, managing director of Bennett, Coleman & Co. Ltd.
Vineet Jain (cricketer), Indian cricketer
Vineet Kothari, Indian judge
Vineet Kumar, Indian actor
Vineet Kumar Singh, Indian actor

Vineeth
 Vineeth Sreenivasan, Indian film actor, producer, director, scriptwriter and singer
Vineeth Kumar, Indian film actor and director
C. K. Vineeth, Indian professional footballer
Vineeth Vincent, Indian beatboxer
Vineeth Radhakrishnan, Indian film actor, classical dancer, voice artist and choreographer
Vineeth Revi Mathew, Indian basketball player
Vineeth Mohan, Indian film actor

References

Indian masculine given names